Islamization conspiracy may refer to:
 Eurabia: a conspiracy theory of globalist elements to Islamise and Arabise Europe.
 Counter-jihad: political movement consisting of organizations, bloggers and activists all linked by a common belief that the West is being subjected to takeover by Muslims.

Islamization